Marte Elden (born 4 July 1986, in Levanger) is a Norwegian cross-country skier who competed between 2005 and 2011.

Cross-country skiing
She won a gold medal at the 2005 Junior World Championship. She made her World Cup debut on 19 November 2005 in Beitostølen, and collected her first World Cup points with a 22nd place on 9 February 2008 in Otepää. She finished among the top ten for the first time on 23 February 2008 in Falun, with a tenth place. She represents the sports club Henning SL, and lives in Namdalseid.

Athletics
Elden was also a talented athlete. She finished sixth in the 800 metres and fourth in the 1500 metres in the 2003 European Youth Summer Olympic Festival, and competed without reaching the final at the 2004 World Junior Championships in Athletics. Her personal best time in the 800 metres was 2:06.77 minutes, achieved in July 2003 in Gothenburg. In the 1500 metres she had 4:25.06 minutes, achieved in July 2002 in Stockholm. She represented Namdalseid IL and Steinkjer FIK.

Cross-country skiing results
All results are sourced from the International Ski Federation (FIS).

World Cup

Season standings

Individual podiums
1 podium – (1 )

References

External links

1986 births
Living people
People from Levanger
Norwegian female cross-country skiers
Norwegian female middle-distance runners
Sportspeople from Trøndelag